Reymondia pyramidalis is a species of small  freshwater snail, an aquatic gastropod mollusk in the family Paludomidae. This species is found in Tanzania and possibly the Democratic Republic of the Congo. Its natural habitat is freshwater lakes.

The shells of this species are similar in appearance to, though slightly smaller than, Reymondia horei.  The maximum size of the shell is  height by  width at the widest point.  It also has a similar habitat preference to R. horei: shallow water, underneath cobbles and rocks.

References

Paludomidae
Fauna of Tanzania
Gastropods described in 1888
Taxonomy articles created by Polbot
Taxa named by Jules René Bourguignat